Eduard Nižňanský (born 21 July 1955 in Martin) is a Slovak historian who specializes in the study of the Slovak State and the Holocaust in Slovakia. Since 2002, he has worked for the Faculty of Arts, Comenius University in Bratislava.

Works

References

1955 births
20th-century Slovak historians
Historians of the Holocaust
Historians of Slovakia
Academic staff of Comenius University
Living people
People from Martin, Slovakia
21st-century Slovak historians